Cécile Paoli is a French actress who is also well known on British television from the series Sharpe, Bergerac, and Holby City.

She starred as Françoise in a four-part television BBC mini-series in 1980 of the H.E. Bates novel, Fair Stood the Wind for France 
 She played Isabelle de Chamonpierre in the 1989 television serial The Ginger Tree, based on the novel by Oswald Wynd.  In Sharpe, she portrayed Lucille Castineau, in Bergerac (TV series) she played Francine Leland, during the first series. She was a member of the Royal Shakespeare Company's 1984–85 season, where her roles included Catherine, Princess of France, (opposite Kenneth Branagh) in Henry V.

She appeared in the Endeavour episode "Sway" in April 2014.

Partial filmography
Les fourberies de Scapin (1981) - Zerbinette
The Legend of the Holy Drinker (1988) - Fur store seller
L'ambassade en folie (1992) - Molly
Voyage à Rome (1992) - Nathalie
Kaspar Hauser (1993) - Stefanie von Baden
Riders (1993) - Laura
Les Collègues (1999) - Inès
Weep no more my lady (1993)

References

External links

Signed portrait

Living people
French film actresses
French television actresses
Royal Shakespeare Company members
Year of birth missing (living people)